Mathew Jarvis (born 25 August 1990) is a rugby union player for Connacht Rugby. His favoured position is out-half. Jarvis signed for Connacht from the Welsh Rugby Union team the Ospreys.

Honours
Jarvis has played for the Welsh U-18 and U-20 teams.

References

Living people
Connacht Rugby players
1990 births
Alumni of the University of Glamorgan
Alumni of the University of South Wales
Ospreys (rugby union) players
Nottingham R.F.C. players